The FIA Institute Young Driver Excellence Academy is a programme founded by the FIA Institute for Motor Sport Safety and Sustainability to develop young driver talent worldwide.

In its first year (2011) the Institute selected 12 drivers to take part in the programme. 19 drivers were shortlisted for a three-day selection event, which took place on 6–8 February 2011 in Melk, Austria.

For 2012, the FIA shortlisted 30 young drivers, of whom 18 have been selected for the second year of the programme.

In 2013, selection events were held across five continents with the winners from each event joining five chosen wildcards to form a ten driver academy.

The participants are being trained by professional racing and rally drivers Alexander Wurz and Robert Reid, with workshops taking place throughout the year.

Participants

2011

2012

2013

2014

 Driver of the Year award

2015

References

External links
FIA Institute for Motor Sport Safety and Sustainability
 

Fédération Internationale de l'Automobile
Organizations established in 2010
Racing schools